The 1991 Cal State Fullerton Titans football team represented California State University, Fullerton as a member of the Big West Conference during the 1991 NCAA Division I-A football season. Led by 12th-year head coach Gene Murphy, Cal State Fullerton compiled an overall record of 2–9 with a mark of 1–6 in conference play, placing last out of eight teams in the Big West for the second consecutive season. The Titans their home games at Santa Ana Stadium in Santa Ana, California. This was the last year they played in Santa Ana Stadium, as the Titans would move to a new, on-campus stadium in 1992.

Schedule

Team players in the NFL
The following Cal State Fullerton players were selected in the 1992 NFL Draft.

References

Cal State Fullerton
Cal State Fullerton Titans football seasons
Cal State Fullerton Titans football